Paul Bowgett (born 17 June 1955) in Hitchin, Hertfordshire, England, is an English retired professional footballer who played as a central defender for Tottenham Hotspur and Wimbledon in the Football League.

He then joined Wealdstone and in 1985 was captain of the team when they won both the FA Trophy and the Gola League (now the Conference National), the first ever club to achieve the non-league 'double' in English football.

References

1955 births
Living people
Sportspeople from Hitchin
English footballers
Association football defenders
Letchworth F.C. players
Wimbledon F.C. players
Tottenham Hotspur F.C. players
Wealdstone F.C. players
Hitchin Town F.C. players
Stevenage F.C. players
Baldock Town F.C. players
English Football League players